In the United States, the National Notifiable Disease Surveillance System (NNDSS) is responsible for sharing information regarding notifiable diseases. As of 2020, the following are the notifiable diseases in the US as mandated by the Centers for Disease Control and Prevention:


Notifiable infectious diseases

 Anthrax
 Arboviral diseases, neuroinvasive and non-neuroinvasive
  California serogroup virus diseases
  Chikungunya virus disease
  Eastern equine encephalitis virus disease
 Powassan virus disease
 Saint Louis encephalitis virus disease
 West Nile virus disease
 Western equine encephalitis virus disease
 Babesiosis
 Botulism
 Botulism, foodborne
 Botulism, infant
 Botulism, wound
 Botulism, other
 Brucellosis
 Campylobacteriosis
 Candida auris
 Carbapenemase Producing Carbapenem-Resistant Enterobacteriaceae (CP-CRE)
 CP-CRE, Enterobacter spp.
 CP-CRE, Escherichia coli (E. coli)
 CP-CRE, Klebsiella spp.
 Chancroid
 Chlamydia trachomatis infection
 Cholera
 Coccidioidomycosis
 Congenital syphilis
 Syphilitic stillbirth
 Coronavirus disease 2019 (COVID-19)
 Cryptosporidiosis
 Cyclosporiasis
 Dengue virus infections
 Dengue
 Dengue-like illness
 Severe dengue
 Diphtheria
 Ehrlichiosis and anaplasmosis
 Anaplasma phagocytophilum infection
 Ehrlichia chaffeensis infection
 Ehrlichia ewingii infection
 Undetermined human ehrlichiosis/anaplasmosis
 Giardiasis
 Gonorrhea
 Haemophilus influenzae, invasive disease
 Hansen's disease
 Hantavirus infection, non-Hantavirus pulmonary syndrome
 Hantavirus pulmonary syndrome
 Hemolytic uremic syndrome, post-diarrheal
 Hepatitis A, acute
 Hepatitis B, acute
 Hepatitis B, chronic
 Hepatitis B, perinatal virus infection
 Hepatitis C, acute
 Hepatitis C, chronic
 Hepatitis C, perinatal infection
 HIV infection
 Influenza-associated pediatric mortality
 Invasive pneumococcal disease
 Legionellosis
 Leptospirosis
 Listeriosis
 Lyme disease
 Malaria
 Measles
 Meningococcal disease
 Mumps
 Novel influenza A virus infections
 Pertussis
 Plague
 Poliomyelitis, paralytic
 Poliovirus infection, nonparalytic
 Psittacosis
 Q fever
 Q fever, acute
 Q fever, chronic
 Rabies, animal
 Rabies, human
 Rubella
 Rubella, congenital syndrome
 Salmonella Paratyphi infection (Salmonella enterica serotypes Paratyphi A, B [tartrate negative], and C [S. Paratyphi])
 Salmonella Typhi infection (Salmonella enterica serotype Typhi)
 Salmonellosis
 Severe acute respiratory syndrome-associated coronavirus disease
 Shiga toxin-producing Escherichia coli
 Shigellosis
 Smallpox
 Spotted fever rickettsiosis
 Streptococcal toxic shock syndrome
 Syphilis
 Syphilis, primary
 Syphilis, secondary
 Syphilis, early non-primary non-secondary
 Syphilis, unknown or late
 Tetanus
 Toxic shock syndrome (other than streptococcal)
 Trichinellosis
 Tuberculosis
 Tularemia
 Vancomycin-intermediate Staphylococcus aureus and Vancomycin-resistant Staphylococcus aureus
 Varicella
 Varicella deaths
 Vibriosis
 Viral hemorrhagic fever
 Crimean-Congo hemorrhagic fever virus
 Ebola virus
 Lassa virus
 Lujo virus
 Marburg virus
 New World arenavirus – Guanarito virus
 New World arenavirus – Junin virus
 New World arenavirus – Machupo virus
 New World arenavirus – Sabia virus
 Yellow fever
 Zika virus disease and Zika virus infection
 Zika virus disease, congenital
 Zika virus disease, non-congenital
 Zika virus infection, congenital
 Zika virus infection, non-congenital

Notifiable non-infectious diseases
 Cancer
 Carbon monoxide poisoning
 Lead, elevated blood levels
 Lead, elevated blood levels, children (<16 Years)
 Lead, elevated blood levels, adult (≥16 Years)
 Pesticide-related illness and injury, acute
 Silicosis

Notifiable outbreaks
 Foodborne disease outbreak
 Waterborne disease outbreak

References

United States
Public health in the United States
Health law in the United States